William Llewellyn Thomas (6 May 1872 – 9 January 1943) was a Welsh international rugby union player who played club rugby for Newport, international rugby for Wales and invitational rugby for the Barbarians. He was educated at Christ College, Brecon and later while at Oxford University he achieved a sporting Blue.

Personal history
Thomas was born in Brecknock, Wales in 1872 and was educated at Christ College, Brecon before attending Oxford University. While at Oxford he won a two sporting Blues in the 1893 and 1894 Varsity Matches. After leaving university he returned to Wales and became an assistant master at his old school, Christ College. He was ordained into the church in 1899 and became a curate in Rushall. He later moved to Llandrindod Wells and in 1910 became captain of the local golf club. In 1912 he moved to Irton and was the village vicar until 1924 when he became the vicar of Bootle in Cumbria; a position he held until his death in 1943. Thomas was the cousin of English international Richard Budworth.

Rugby career

Thomas first played for Newport in the 1893/94 season, and in December 1893 was part of the Newport team that faced the Barbarians. Newport won 19–0 with Thomas and Wallace Watts both scoring two tries for the 'black and ambers'. Thomas was later selected for the national side as part of the 1894 Home Nations Championship. Brought in as a replacement for Cardiff's Norman Biggs, Thomas was part of a three-quarters with team mate and Wales' captain 'Monkey' Gould, and Cardiff pairing Tom Pearson and Dai Fitzgerald. Despite a heavy defeat by England a month earlier, the Welsh selectors kept faith with majority of the team, so Thomas and Fitzgerald were the only two new caps. The Scottish attempted a half-hearted trial of the four three-quarter system, which did not prove fruitful; Wales won the game 7–0.

Thomas lost his place when Biggs returned for the final game of the tournament, but was back in the team the next season when he was chosen to play in the opening game of the 1895 Championship. The Welsh team contained five new caps, but the England team they faced fielded ten international debuts. Although vastly more inexperienced, the English team were victorious, and in the away game to Scotland Thomas was replaced by Evan Lloyd. Thomas' final game was his third home match, all of which had been played at different Welsh grounds, Rodney Parade, St. Helen's and now, against Ireland, the Cardiff Arms Park. Wales were victorious, giving Thomas a final international record of two wins and a loss, but the next season the selectors chose the wing partnership of Cliff Bowen and Bert Dauncey.

International matches played
Wales
  1895
 Ireland 1895
  1894

Bibliography

References

1872 births
1943 deaths
Barbarian F.C. players
Newport RFC players
Oxford University RFC players
People educated at Christ College, Brecon
People from Bootle, Cumbria
Rugby union players from Cumbria
Rugby union players from Brecon
Rugby union wings
Wales international rugby union players
Welsh rugby union players